Greylisting can refer to:

Greylisting (email), a method of defending e-mail users against spam
Greylisting (employment), a form of blacklisting for lesser offenses
Hollywood graylist, people who were on the Hollywood blacklist operated by the major studios, but could find work at minor film studios on Poverty Row